Erave may refer to:

Erave language
The Erave dialect of the Kewa language
Erave, a settlement in Kagua-Erave District, Papua New Guinea